Special Operations Division may refer to:

Law enforcement
 The Special Operations Division of the US Drug Enforcement Administration, dealing with telephone tapping

Military
 Special Operations Division (Bundeswehr), is an airborne division of the German Army
 The Special Operations Division in the United States Army Biological Warfare Laboratories